Stadtpilot is a project of the Braunschweig University of Technology, Germany. Following the qualification for the DARPA Grand Challenge (2007) with the project CarOLO, this project aims to send the cars Henry and Leonie on a course through the Braunschweig inner city (Stadtring).

On October 8, 2010, Leonie was sent on the Stadtring course in real urban traffic; reportedly being the first in the world to do so.

Footnotes 

Self-driving cars
Research and development in Germany